The Azuga is a left tributary of the river Prahova in Romania. It discharges into the Prahova in the town Azuga.

Tributaries

The following rivers are tributaries to the river Azuga (from source to mouth):

Left: Pârâul Roșu, Retevoi, Valea Lacului Roșu, Valea Turcului, Ștevia, Valea Roșie, Unghia Mică, Unghia Mare, Ceaușoaia, Cazacu, Urechea, Sita
Right: Limbășel, Glodu, Valea Pichetului, Cășăria

References

Rivers of Romania
Rivers of Prahova County
Rivers of Brașov County